Givi Gachechiladze (born November 5, 1938) is a Georgian composer and conductor, currently the leader of the Tbilisi Municipal Orchestra. Givi Gachechiladze first gained public attention with an instrumental composition called "Vic" which was included in Victor Feldman's Soviet Jazz Themes (Äva, 1962), the world's first album of Soviet jazz released in the US and abroad in 1963. Later, Givi Gachechiladze led the Ukrainian Jazz Orchestra as well as the Pop/Symphony Orchestra of Ukrainian National Television (Kiev-Channel One). After returning to Georgia, he was the leader of the Tbilisi Philharmonic, the composer, conductor and musical director of Rero, the Tbilisi Television Orchestra, Theatron, and Mardzhanishvili Theater. In 1997, he founded the Tbilisi Municipal Orchestra, which brought the band leader even more recognition. Today the orchestra, also known as the Tbilisi Big Band or the Tbilisi Concert Orchestra, is one of the most highly sought orchestras in the post-Soviet region. In 2006, the Tbilisi Municipal Orchestra, Givi Gachechiladze's direction, won the Monte-Carlo International Jazz Awards of 2006.

Gachechiladze is the author of hundreds of jazz and classical compositions, as well as soundtracks for films and plays.

Filmography
 2001 Khveuli kibit 
 1989 Cha 
 1988 Khdeba kholme... (TV Movie) 
 1987 Bravo, Alber Lolish

References

External links
 Gramophone Magazine review, December 1963 issue
 ГАЧЕЧИЛАДЗЕ Гиви Георгиевич

1938 births
20th-century classical composers
20th-century conductors (music)
20th-century male musicians
21st-century classical composers
21st-century conductors (music)
21st-century male musicians
Classical composers from Georgia (country)
Conductors (music) from Georgia (country)
Jazz-influenced classical composers
Living people
Male classical composers
Male conductors (music)
Musicians from Tbilisi
Place of birth missing (living people)
Soviet conductors (music)